The Laguna 26 is an American sailboat that was designed by W. Shad Turner as a cruiser and first built in 1982.

Production
The design was built by Laguna Yachts in the United States, starting in 1982, with 400 boats completed by the time production ended.

The Windrose 26 is a similar Turner design that was produced by Laguna concurrently. The Classic 26 was built starting in 1991 by Classic Yachts using the old Laguna Yachts tooling.

Design
The Laguna 26 is a recreational keelboat, built predominantly of fiberglass, with wood trim. It has a masthead sloop rig, a raked stem, a plumb transom, a transom-hung rudder controlled by a tiller and a fixed fin keel. It displaces  and carries  of ballast.

See also
List of sailing boat types

References

External links
Photo of a Laguna 26

Keelboats
1980s sailboat type designs
Sailing yachts
Sailboat type designs by W. Shad Turner
Sailboat types built by Laguna Yachts